XHUTU-FM is a Mexican college radio station owned by the Universidad Tecnológica del Usumacinta in Emiliano Zapata, Tabasco. The station broadcasts on 90.5 MHz.

History
XHUTU received its permit in 2011 and held its formal inauguration on September 4, 2012.

References

Radio stations in Tabasco
University radio stations in Mexico